Frederick Stoward (1866–14 December 1931) was the Government Botanist with the Department of Agriculture in Western Australia from 1911 to 1917.

Born at Axbridge, Somerset, England, he was a member of the Hardy family famous for the Hardy Wine Company. He emigrated to Australia when he was about 15 years old, but later returned to Europe, studying at the Pasteur Institute of Paris, from which he obtained either a D.Sc. or a PhD on returning to Australia he worked at the Royal Park Laboratories in Melbourne, before taking up the position of Government Botanist with the Department of Agriculture in 1911. In 1917 he retired, apparently returning to his family's wine business in South Australia. He died in 1931 in Kensington Gardens, Adelaide.

Stoward specialised in fermentation and other chemical processes, publishing papers like On the Influence Exercised by certain Acids on the Inversion of Saccharose by Sucrase and On Endospermic Respiration in Certain Seeds. He did not publish any taxa, and so does not have a botanical author abbreviation. He did, however, collect the type of Eucalyptus stowardii, which was named in Stoward's honour by Joseph Maiden in 1917.

References
 

1866 births
1931 deaths
Botanists active in Australia
Botany in Western Australia
English botanists
People from Axbridge
Scientists from Western Australia